Trevathana is a genus of coral barnacles in the family Pyrgomatidae. There are about 11 described species in Trevathana.

Species
These species belong to the genus Trevathana:
 Trevathana dentata (Darwin, 1854)
 Trevathana isfae Achituv & Langsam, 2009
 Trevathana jensi Brickner, Simon-Blecher & Achituv, 2010
 Trevathana margaretae Brickner, Simon-Blecher & Achituv, 2010
 Trevathana mizrachae Brickner, Simon-Blecher & Achituv, 2010
 Trevathana niuea Achituv, 2004
 Trevathana orientalis (Ren, 1986)
 Trevathana paulayi Asami & Yamaguchi, 2001
 Trevathana sarae Brickner, Simon-Blecher & Achituv, 2010
 Trevathana synthesysae Achituv & Langsam, 2009
 Trevathana tureiae Achituv & Langsam, 2005

References

External links

 

Barnacles